Valdir Ataualpa Ramirez Espinosa, known as Valdir Espinosa (17 October 1947 – 27 February 2020) was a Brazilian football manager. He died on 27 February 2020, of complications after surgery. Espinosa was born in Porto Alegre.

Managerial statistics

Honours
Ceará
 Campeonato Cearense (1): 1980

Londrina 
 Campeonato Paranaense (1): 1981

Grêmio
 Copa Libertadores (1): 1983
 Intercontinental Cup (1): 1983
 Campeonato Gaúcho (1): 1986

Al-Hilal
 Saudi Premier League (1): 1984–85

Cerro Porteño
Liga Paraguaya (2): 1987, 1992

Botafogo
 Campeonato Carioca (1): 1989

Tokyo Verdy 
 Emperor's Cup: 1997

Atlético Paranaense
 Campeonato Paranaense (1): 2002

Brasiliense
 Campeonato Brasiliense (1): 2005

References

External links
 sambafoot

1947 births
2020 deaths
Brazilian football managers
Campeonato Brasileiro Série A managers
Campeonato Brasileiro Série B managers
Expatriate football managers in Saudi Arabia
Expatriate football managers in Japan
Expatriate football managers in Paraguay
Brazilian expatriates in Paraguay
J1 League managers
Clube Esportivo Bento Gonçalves managers
Grêmio Foot-Ball Porto Alegrense managers
Al Hilal SFC managers
Cerro Porteño managers
Botafogo de Futebol e Regatas managers
CR Flamengo managers
Clube Atlético Mineiro managers
Sociedade Esportiva Palmeiras managers
Associação Portuguesa de Desportos managers
Sport Club Corinthians Paulista managers
Fluminense FC managers
Tokyo Verdy managers
Coritiba Foot Ball Club managers
Esporte Clube Vitória managers
Club Athletico Paranaense managers
Brasiliense Futebol Clube managers
Ceará Sporting Club managers
Fortaleza Esporte Clube managers
Santa Cruz Futebol Clube managers
CR Vasco da Gama managers
Duque de Caxias Futebol Clube managers
Clube Atlético Metropolitano managers
Sportspeople from Porto Alegre